Borownica  is a village in the administrative district of Gmina Bircza, within Przemyśl County, Subcarpathian Voivodeship, in south-eastern Poland.

In Borownica was born Julian Stanczak.

The village has a population of 110.

References

Borownica